The Port Washington Union Free School District is a public school district on Long Island, in New York.

Overview

Service area 
The Port Washington UFSD serves the villages of Baxter Estates, Manorhaven, Port Washington North, and Sands Point, and the unincorporated hamlet of Port Washington, as well as portions of the villages of Flower Hill and Plandome Manor.

Superintendent 
The district's superintendent is Dr. Michael Hynes.

Mascot 
The district's mascot is the viking.

Schools 
The Port Washington UFSD operates the following schools:

Elementary 

 Guggenheim Elementary School
 John J. Daly Elementary School
 John Philip Sousa Elementary School
 Manorhaven Elementary School
 South Salem Elementary School

Secondary 

 Carrie Palmer Weber Middle School
 Paul D. Schreiber Senior High School

Demographics 
As of the 2018-2019 school year, the district had a total of 5,356 enrolled students in kindergarten through 12th grade.

The tables below show the breakdowns of the district's demographics, as of the 2019-2019 school year:

Additionally, out of the 5,356 students, 447 (8%) are English Language Learners (ELL), 836 (16%) have at least 1 disability, 1,132 (21%) are economically disadvantaged, and 49 (1%) are homeless.

See also 

 List of school districts in New York
 List of Long Island public school districts and schools

References

External links 

 Port Washington UFSD website

School districts in New York (state)
Education in Nassau County, New York